Leptostylopsis argentatus is a species of longhorn beetles of the subfamily Lamiinae. It was described by Jacquelin du Val in 1857.

References

Acanthocinini
Beetles described in 1857